The Women's 100 metre butterfly competition of the 2018 European Aquatics Championships was held on 3 and 4 August 2018.

Records
Prior to the competition, the existing world and championship records were as follows.

Results

Heats
The heats were started on 3 August at 10:36.

Semifinals
The semifinals were held on 3 August at 17:32.

Semifinal 1

Semifinal 2

Final
The final was held on 4 August at 17:18.

References

Women's 100 metre butterfly